Capinota Municipality is the first municipal section of the Capinota Province in the Cochabamba Department, Bolivia. Its seat is Capinota.

See also 
 Puka Mayu

References 

 Instituto Nacional de Estadistica de Bolivia

Municipalities of the Cochabamba Department